Matadeen v Pointu [1998] UKPC 9 is a constitutional law decision of the Judicial Committee of the Privy Council on appeal from the Supreme Court of Mauritius. The case is relevant for English administrative law and concerns equal rights and protection under a constitution.

Facts
Mauritian children sat an annual Certification of Primary Education in English, French, maths and environment, to determine their secondary school. Under authority to make examination regulations granted by Mauritius Examinations Syndicate Act 1984 s 4(a), in March 1995 the Minister changed this to include an optional fifth paper in an oriental language, and candidates who did that would have the best two grades considered out of the three languages. Parents of children due for exams in 1995 and 1996 argued the Ministers actions discriminated against their children, compared to those who had already happened to follow a course of study in an oriental language (i.e. on grounds of whether oriental languages were studied).

The Supreme Court of Mauritius held that the Minister’s actions, because of short notice, did violate the right to equality in the Constitution ss 1 and 3 (protection of the law, and other rights and freedoms), having regard to the Declaration of the Rights of Man 1793 and the International Covenant on Civil and Political Rights, art 26. There was no objective justification, given the short notice.

Advice
The Privy Council advised that a true construction of the Mauritian Constitution made the right to anti-discrimination limited to just a few grounds in section 16, and for others, it was a matter for the legislature, the minister, or other public body. There was no general, free standing equality clause. Although the French Declaration was a legitimate aid, that could not curtail explicit powers of Parliament, and there was nothing in the ICCPR which helped either, in absence of a general equality clause.

Lord Hoffmann delivered the advice.

Lord Browne-Wilkinson, Lord Hope, Lord Clyde, and Gaunt J concurred.

See also
UK administrative law
UK constitutional law
UK public law

Notes

References

United Kingdom administrative case law
Judicial Committee of the Privy Council cases on appeal from Mauritius
1998 in Mauritius
1998 in case law
Constitution of Mauritius